HMS Cubitt (K512) was a  of the British Royal Navy that served during World War II. The ship was transferred to the UK under Lend-Lease on 17 November 1943, and named after Captain J. Cubitt, a Navy officer who commanded the frigate  in 1661.

Service history
Cubitt was assigned to Nore Command, serving in the 21st Escort Group based at Harwich. She did not take part in the Normandy landings on 6 June 1944, but was afterwards deployed escorting convoys to and from the landing beaches. Towards the end of 1944 Cubitt became a Coastal Forces Control Frigate (CFCF), controlling a flotilla of Motor Torpedo Boats operating in the Channel and North Sea to counter the threat of enemy E-Boats.

On 29 January 1945 Cubitt was on patrol with HMS Caicos and three MTBs, the Caicos signalled contact with two groups of E-boats. Lt Cmdr Gregory ordered Caicos to take on the group to the north and turned Cubitt with his MTBs to engage the other group. The seas that night were choppy and the MTBs found themselves speed restricted to 20 knots, a clear 10 knots slower than the E-boats. Five miles behind their target Gregory took the decision to leave behind the slower MTBs and took off to engage the E-boats alone. Managing to close to just a mile away, his enemy closed on a minefield into which it could retreat. Gregory’s gunners’ visibility was still hugely impaired and  Cubitt was forced to send up flares for a last ditch barrage. The E-boats, warned by the light, veered away: declining the challenge for a fight. Gregory was described in reports as ‘stamping in fury’ at their refusal to engage. Cubitt’s forward gunners fired off twelve rounds before losing range.  

In February 1945 Cubitt was refitted at Tilbury. Her 2-pounder "pom pom" bow chaser was removed, the two 20 mm Oerlikons mounted in front of the bridge were replaced with two single 40 mm Bofors, and splinter shields were fitted to her  guns.

She opened fire, and two were severely damaged and a third was hit before they could move out of range, but a patrolling aircraft then attacked and drove them towards the MTBs, resulting in a fierce close-quarter action. A Motor Gun Boat and an E-Boat collided, and Cubitt picked up casualties from another MGB that was on fire. The following night Rutherford and Cubitt were on patrol off Ostend, when an aircraft directed Rutherford towards a formation of E-Boats, and in five minutes two E-boats were sunk and several others damaged. Cubitt managed to fire a few shots as the E-boats fled under cover of a smoke screen.

Cubitt visited several Dutch ports immediately after they were liberated, and after VE Day escorted ships to Oslo and Brunsbüttel. Cubitt was then assigned to "Operation Deadlight", towing surrendered U-boats from Loch Ryan out into the North Atlantic where they were sunk.

Cubitt was returned to the U.S. Navy on 4 March 1946, struck from the Navy List on 12 April 1946, and sold for scrapping on 7 March 1947.

References

1943 ships
Ships built in Hingham, Massachusetts
Captain-class frigates
Buckley-class destroyer escorts
World War II frigates of the United Kingdom